William Curtis Kenyon (December 5, 1898 – May 6, 1951) was an American football and baseball player and coach of football, basketball, and baseball.  He served as the head football coach at the University of Maine in 1942 and from 1944 to 1945, compiling a record of 4–11. Kenyon also the head coach of the basketball team at Maine from 1935 to 1943 and again in 1944–45, and the head coach of the baseball team at the school from 1936 to 1943 and again from 1945 to 1949.  Kenyon played college football at Georgetown University from 1919 to 1922 and in the National Football League with the New York Giants in 1925.  He also played baseball at Georgetown and was inducted into the university's Athletic Hall of Fame in 1927.  Kenyon died on May 6, 1951 at a hospital in Bangor, Maine.

Head coaching record

Football

Baseball
Below is a table of Kenyon's yearly records as a collegiate head baseball coach.

See also
 List of college football head coaches with non-consecutive tenure

References

External links
 

1898 births
1951 deaths
American football ends
American football fullbacks
Georgetown Hoyas baseball players
Georgetown Hoyas football players
New York Giants players
Maine Black Bears baseball coaches
Maine Black Bears football coaches
Maine Black Bears men's basketball coaches
Sportspeople from Manchester, New Hampshire
Coaches of American football from New Hampshire
Players of American football from New Hampshire
Basketball coaches from New Hampshire